I kill is a thriller written by Giorgio Faletti. The book was translated from Italian and became a best seller, published in 27 editions, to English, in which it also went on to become a best seller, published in 10 editions.

The Italian edition was published in Milan in 2002. The English language translation by the author was first published in Milan by Baldini Castoldi Dalai in 2008 and in 2010 in London by Constable. According to WorldCat, it is held in 440 libraries. It was also translated into other languages, often in multiple editions:  <  Spanish, translated  by Rosa S Corgatell, published in 2005 with the title Yo mato. ; Chinese, as 我殺 / Wo sha   and as 非人  / Fei ren ; French, as Je tue; Portuguese, as Eu mato; Czech, as Já vraždím; Russian, as Я убиваю; Dutch, as Ik dood; Croatian, as Ja ubijam ; German, as Ich töte; Hebrew, as אני הורג; Danish as Jeg dræber; Slovenian as Jaz ubijam; Swedish as Jag dödar; Finnish as Minä tapan; Polish as Ja zabijam;

References

2010 Italian novels
Constable & Robinson books
Italian crime novels
Novels set in Monaco